The 2012 season was Bunyodkors 6th season in the Uzbek League in Uzbekistan, and they also competed in the Uzbekistan Cup and the AFC Champions League. Bunyodkor reached the Semi-Finals of the AFC Champions League before being beaten 5–1 on aggregate by Ulsan Hyundai of South Korea.

Club

Current technical staff

Squad

Transfers

In

Loans in

Out

Loans out

Released

Trial

Friendly matches

Pre-season

2012 Match World Cup

Mid-season

Competitions
Bunyodkor was present in all major competitions: Uzbek League, the AFC Champions League and the Uzbek Cup.

Uzbek League

Results summary

Results by round

Results

League table

Uzbek Cup

Matches

AFC Champions League

Group stage

Knockout stage

Squad statistics

Appearances and goals

|-
|colspan="14"|Players who appeared for Bunyodkor no longer at the club:

|}

Goal scorers

Disciplinary Record

References

2012
Bunyodkor